KYMO (1080 AM) is a radio station licensed to East Prairie, Missouri, United States. The station is currently owned by Delta Broadcasting, LLC.

On April 9, 2021, KYMO changed their format from a simulcast of classic hits-formatted KYMO-FM to classic country, branded as "Shotgun Radio 97.1" (simulcast on FM translator K246DB (97.1 FM licensed to Sikeston, MO)).

References

External links

YMO
Radio stations established in 1965
1965 establishments in Missouri
YMO (AM)
Classic country radio stations in the United States